NK Bjelovar is a Croatian football club based in the town of Bjelovar.

Honours

Treća HNL – North:
Winners (1): 2003–04

Recent seasons

Key

P = Played
W = Games won
D = Games drawn
L = Games lost
F = Goals for
A = Goals against
Pts = Points
Pos = Final position

1. HNL = Prva HNL
2. HNL = Druga HNL
3. HNL = Treća HNL

PR = Preliminary round
R1 = Round 1
R2 = Round 2
QF = Quarter-finals
SF = Semi-finals
RU = Runners-up
W  = Winners

Current squad

External links
Official website 

 
Association football clubs established in 1908
Football clubs in Croatia
Football clubs in Bjelovar-Bilogora County
1908 establishments in Croatia
Sport in Bjelovar